The Nepal national basketball team represents Nepal in international basketball competitions and is managed by the Nepal Basketball Association (NeBA). (Nepali: नेपाल बास्केटबल संघ)

Nepal joined the International Federation of Basketball (FIBA) in 2000 and is Asia's youngest member. Already, the team has succeeded at the regional level as it won two bronze medals at the SABA Championship.

Roster
Roster for the 2018 FIBA Asia Cup 2021 SABA Pre-Qualifier.

|url          = https://web.archive.org/web/20150301013059/http://basketball.com.np/
|countryflag  =NP

Competitions

International

Olympic Games

FIBA Basketball World Cup

Continental

FIBA Asia Cup

Asian Games

Regional

SABA Championship
2002 : Did Not Participate
2013 : 
2014 : 4th
2015 : 
2016 : 
2017: 4th

South Asian Games

5x5 
2004 : ?
2010 : 4th
2019 :

3x3
2019:

See also
Nepal women's national basketball team
Nepal national under-19 basketball team
Nepal national under-17 basketball team

References

External links
Nepal Basketball Association - Official Website
Basketball.Sansar.com Nepali and international basketball portal
NEPAL BASKETBALL - Updates on Basketball Activities in Nepal
Nepal Basketball on Twitter
Nepal Basketball on Facebook
Nepal Basketball Association on Facebook

B
Men's national basketball teams
2000 establishments in Nepal
Basketball in Nepal
Basketball teams in Nepal
Basketball teams established in 2000